The Lancer 27 PS is an American sailboat that was designed by Herb David as a motorsailer and cruiser and first built in 1983. The PS designation indicates "Power Sailer".

Production
The design was built by Lancer Yachts in the United States, from 1983 until 1985, but it is now out of production.

Design
The Lancer 27 PS is a recreational keelboat, built predominantly of fiberglass, with wood trim. It has a fractional sloop rig, a sharply raked stem, a plumb transom wit a fixed swimming platform, an internally mounted spade-type rudder controlled by a wheel and a fixed fin keel. It displaces  and carries  of ballast.

The design has sleeping accommodation for four people, with a double "V"-berth in the bow cabin around a drop-down table and an aft cabin with a transversely-mounted double berth. The galley is located on the starboard side just forward of the companionway ladder. The galley is "L"-shaped and is equipped with a stove, icebox and a sink. The head is located opposite the gallery on the port side.

See also
List of sailing boat types

References

External links
Video about a Lancer 27 PS renovation project

Keelboats
Motorsailers
1980s sailboat type designs
Sailing yachts
Sailboat type designs by Herb David
Sailboat types built by Lancer Yachts